Barz may refer to:

People
 Chris Barz, American musician
 Diane Barz (1943–2014), American judge
 Mike Barz (born 1970), American broadcaster and news anchor
 Monika Barz (born 1953), German feminist and professor
 Barz (born not long ago), Worldwide known DJ and producer.
 Max Barz (born 1998), famous model and broadcaster

Places
Barz, Iran, a village in Natanz County, Isfahan Province, Iran
Barz, Kerman, a village in Rafsanjan County, Kerman Province, Iran
Barz, Romania, a village in a commune in Caraș-Severin County, Romania

See also